The Hohe List is a hill near Eppenbrunn, in the county of Südwestpfalz in the German state of Rhineland-Palatinate. It is 475.8 m high. The Hohe List is the third highest summit in the western part of the Wasgau, a cross-border region that includes the southern part of the Palatinate Forest and the northern part of the Vosges in France.

References 

Mountains and hills of Rhineland-Palatinate